Thomas Tod Stoddart (1810–1880) was a Scottish angler and poet.

Life
He was born on 14 February 1810 in Argyle Square, Edinburgh, the eldest son of Frances (née Sprot), daughter of James Sprot, and Captain (later Admiral) Pringle Stoddart RN. At the age of ten he was sent to a Moravian Church school in Lancashire; then returned to attend Edinburgh High School and the University of Edinburgh. One of his university teachers was John Wilson, in whose house Stoddart met Thomas De Quincey, Hartley Coleridge, James Hogg the Ettrick Shepherd, William Edmonstoune Aytoun, James Frederick Ferrier, Henry Glassford Bell, and other men of letters.

In 1833 Stoddart was admitted a member of the Faculty of Advocates, but never practised the law. An early passion for angling became the main business of his life. He investigated the haunts and habits of fish, and was an adept of fly-making.

Stoddart campaigned against the pollution of rivers. In the decade leading up to the Rivers Pollution Prevention Act 1876 he was involved with the Tweed Commissioners, and was involved in the trials and surveys of the fish population of the River Tweed using smolt.

His niece was the New Zealand artist, Margaret Stoddart, daughter of his brother Mark Pringle Stoddart.

Bibliography
With expertise in fly fishing, Stoddart published books, poems and articles on angling.

The Death-wake, or, Lunacy: a Necromaunt in Three Chimeras (1831), verse. Reprinted in 1895 by John Lane with an introduction by Andrew Lang.
The Art of Angling as Practised in Scotland (1835)
Angling Reminiscences (1837)
Songs and Poems (1839)
The Angler's Companion to the Rivers and Lochs of Scotland (1847, 1853)
An Angler's Rambles and Angling Songs (1866)

Family
In 1836 Stoddart married Bessie Macgregor, daughter of a farmer at Contin in Ross-shire, whom he met while on a fishing tour, and they settled at Kelso. They had two sons and a daughter Anna Stoddart, who became the biographer of her father and also of John Stuart Blackie.

References

External links
 
 

Scottish poets
Angling writers
British fishers
1810 births
1880 deaths
19th-century poets